The Neocomian Sands is an Early Cretaceous geologic formation in Atyrau, Kazakhstan. Dinosaur remains have been recovered from the formation.

Fossil content 
 Embasaurus minax - "Vertebrae."

See also 
 List of dinosaur-bearing rock formations
 List of stratigraphic units with few dinosaur genera

References

Bibliography 
  

Geologic formations of Kazakhstan
Lower Cretaceous Series of Asia
Cretaceous Kazakhstan
Berriasian Stage
Valanginian Stage
Hauterivian Stage
Sandstone formations
Paleontology in Kazakhstan